Appias panda, the Nicobar albatross, is a small butterfly of the family Pieridae, that is, the yellows and whites, which is found in the Nicobar Islands of India.

See also
 Pieridae
 List of butterflies of India
 List of butterflies of India (Pieridae)

References

 
  
 
 
 

panda
Butterflies of Asia
Endemic fauna of the Nicobar Islands
Butterflies described in 1903
Taxa named by Hans Fruhstorfer